The 1965 Tampa Spartans football team represented the University of Tampa in the 1965 NCAA College Division football season. It was the Spartans' 29th season. The team was led by head coach Sam Bailey, in his second year, and played their home games at Phillips Field in Tampa, Florida. They finished with a record of six wins, two losses and one tie (6–2–1).

Schedule

References

Tampa
Tampa Spartans football seasons
Tampa Spartans football